The Surprise Opera House is a historic building in Surprise, Nebraska. It was built in 1910-1913 as a venue for touring performers. It was also a meeting place for women's events, including the local American Red Cross chapter. Inside, there is a 38.5 metre high auditorium, with a 19-foot high proscenium arch. The building has been listed on the National Register of Historic Places since July 6, 1988.

References

National Register of Historic Places in Butler County, Nebraska
Buildings and structures completed in 1913